Marcel Loncle (born 5 January 1936 in Saint-Malo) is a retired French football player who played for Angers SCO and Rennes, as well as the French national side. He was part of France's squad at the 1960 Summer Olympics.

References

External links
  Player profile at FFF

1936 births
Living people
French footballers
France international footballers
Angers SCO players
Stade Rennais F.C. players
Ligue 1 players
Sportspeople from Ille-et-Vilaine
Olympic footballers of France
Footballers at the 1960 Summer Olympics
Association football midfielders
Footballers from Brittany
Sportspeople from Saint-Malo